The 23rd Upper Silesian Infantry Division (Polish: 23. Gornoslaska Dywizja Piechoty) was a unit of the Polish Army in the interwar period (1921-1939). Created in 1921, its headquarters were stationed in Upper Silesian town of Tarnowskie Góry. Also, some other units were located in garrisons across the Polish part of Upper Silesia:
 in Katowice - 73rd Infantry Regiment,
 in Tarnowskie Gory - 11th Infantry Regiment,
 in Chorzów, Rybnik and Wielkie Hajduki - 75th Infantry Regiment,
 in Żory and Będzin - 23rd Light Artillery Regiment.

In October 1938 the Division, under General Jan Jagmin-Sadowski, participated in the annexation of Zaolzie. A year later, in September 1939, it took part in the Polish September Campaign. Commanded by Colonel Wladyslaw Powierza, it was part of Operational Group "Silesia"/"Jagmin" of the Army Kraków, under General Antoni Szylling.
 
On September 1 and 2, the unit defended the so-called Fortified Area of Silesia, then it was ordered to support the 55th I.D., which was fighting around Wyry and Kobiór. After several skirmishes with German 28th I.D., the Poles withdrew towards the Nida River. Between September 4 and 20, the Division retreated eastwards, repelling German attacks and beating the enemy in Biłgoraj. On September 19, the Division joined units attacking Tomaszów Lubelski, but these efforts were fruitless. It fought until the capitulation of Army Kraków, September 20.

See also
 Polish army order of battle in 1939
 Polish contribution to World War II
 List of Polish divisions in World War II

References

Further reading
Tadeusz Jurga: Wojsko Polskie : krótki informator historyczny o Wojsku Polskim w latach II wojny światowej. 7, Regularne jednostki Wojska Polskiego w 1939 : organizacja, działania bojowe, uzbrojenie, metryki związków operacyjnych, dywizji i brygad. Warszawa : Wydawnictwo Ministerstwa Obrony Narodowej 1975.

Infantry divisions of Poland
Military units and formations established in 1921
Infantry divisions of Poland in World War II